Zambia Railways (ZR) is the national railway company of Zambia, one of the two major railway organisations in Zambia. The other system is the binational TAZARA Railway (TAZARA) that interconnects with the ZR at Kapiri Mposhi and provides a link to the Tanzanian port of Dar es Salaam.

History

The  gauge Cape gauge ZR network was built during British colonial rule as part of the vision of the Cape-Cairo railway but the economic spur was to access the mines of Central Africa. The railway started as part of Rhodesia Railways, the company which ran the railways of Northern Rhodesia and Southern Rhodesia as an integrated operation, which was one of the largest employers and enterprises in both countries. The railway arrived in the future Zambia early in 1905 when the 150 km Livingstone-Kalomo line was built in advance of completion in September of that year of the Victoria Falls Bridge from the then Southern Rhodesia to Livingstone. The first wagons on the line were hauled by oxen, then a single locomotive was conveyed in pieces by cableway across the gorge where the bridge was being built to start up operations to Kalomo in advance of the main line connection.

Another major bridge was required to cross the Kafue River and the 427 m long Kafue Railway Bridge, the longest on the Rhodesia Railways or Zambian Railways network, was completed in 1906.

The line reached Broken Hill (Kabwe) in 1906 and Ndola in the Copperbelt in 1909 (connecting to Sakania in the Belgian Congo), some 20 years before the first large-scale copper mines opened there.

Zambia Railways operates the Mulobezi Railway, a branch line from Livingstone, built as a private timber line.

In the mid-1960s, spurred by the Rhodesian UDI crisis, the newly independent Zambia split its railways off from Rhodesia Railways, and Zambia Railways came into being.

Railway Systems of Zambia

Railway Systems of Zambia Limited (RSZ) is a private company incorporated and registered in Zambia. It is a subsidiary of NLPI Ltd (NLPI), an investment holding company.

The NLPI Consortium participated in a tender in respect of the Zambia Railways Concession.  The Consortium was declared the winner with the signing of the Freight Concession Agreement on 14 February 2003.

The Concession was to operate for a period of 20 years with a possible extension for a further 10 years. However, in September 2012, the government revoked the concession and Zambia Railways resumed control.

International links
There are no current international passenger services of the ZR, only of the TAZARA railway. Some tour companies have run special services on the ZR network.

Democratic Republic of the Congo

The Copperbelt reaches into the Katanga province of the Democratic Republic of the Congo with mines at Lubumbashi and further north-west. The ZR network connects to Lubumbashi via Ndola and Sakania. At one time the Lubumbashi line connected to the Benguela Railway through Angola to Lobito Bay, but the line did not operate from the 1970s, until reopening in 2018.

TAZARA Railway

As most of its major export routes ran through then apartheid controlled South Africa, Zambia needed an alternate export route for its copper. In 1976, Chinese construction crews completed the 1,860-kilometer-long Tanzania-Zambia Railway (TAZARA) which runs from Kapiri Mposhi just north of the Zambian capital Lusaka, to the Tanzanian capital and major east African port of Dar es Salaam. After being operated jointly by the two nationalised railway systems, the Chinese again took over the running of TAZARA in a joint transport agreement from January 2007, which covered both direct air links to Beijing Capital International Airport and copper ore export.

Zimbabwe, Mozambique and South Africa

Via Victoria Falls Bridge the Zimbabwe rail network and the ports in Mozambique (Beira, Maputo) and the South African Railways of South Africa can be reached. The condition of the 100-year-old bridge restricts traffic.

Up to the mid-1960s, passenger and sleeper services ran from Ndola to Bulawayo, Zimbabwe (then Rhodesia), connecting with a sleeper service to Cape Town and the Union Castle shipping line to Southampton, UK. This was the main travel route between south-central Africa and Europe before the Jet age. The journey from Ndola to Cape Town took five days.

Ndola-Bulawayo passenger services ended when Zambia suspended all services across the Victoria Falls Bridge in response to Rhodesia's UDI crisis. Freight services were occasionally resumed up to the line re-opening in 1980, but successful passenger services have not resumed.

Mozambique and Malawi

A rail link to the Sena railway between Mozambique, Malawi and Zambia, allowing access to the port of Nacala, was first planned in 1982. On the Malawi side of the border, the line to Mchinji was finished in 1984, but a connection to Chipata in Zambia was only opened in 2010. This line remains idle because there are few facilities at Chipata.

Maps 
 UN Map of Zambia

See also

 Rail transport in Zambia
 Railway Systems of Zambia (RSZ)

References

External links
 illustrated account of the development of the railways of Rhodesia
Zambia Railways Limited passenger services

Railway companies of Zambia
3 ft 6 in gauge railways in Zambia
Companies established in the 1960s